Annedroids is a Canadian CGI/live action television series created by J. J. Johnson. The series is produced by Sinking Ship Entertainment in association with broadcasters TVOntario, SRC and KiKa. Annedroids was released on Amazon Prime Video on July 25, 2014 in the UK and U.S. and premiered on August 25, 2014 on TVOKids in Ontario, Canada. The show's aim is to educate children about science, technology, engineering and math (STEM) from the perspectives of an 11-year-old girl, her friends, and her three Android creations.

SRC and KiKa both agreed to opt for 26 episodes of Annedroids over two seasons, while TVO purchased four seasons. On February 25, 2015, Amazon picked up Annedroids for a second season, which was released on July 2, 2015. In 2016 it was nominated for a Daytime Emmy Award for Outstanding Children's Series. Season 3 was released on June 24, 2016. The fourth and final season was released on March 3, 2017.

Cast

Humans 
 Addison Holley as Anne Sagan, the title character who is a child prodigy
 Jadiel Dowlin as Nick Clegg - Anne's friend
 Adrianna Di Liello as Shania - Anne's friend
 James Gangl as Wilbert Sagan - Anne's father
 Raven Dauda as Maggie Clegg - Nick's mother and reporter
 Jonny Gray as Zack - Nick's friend
 Jayne Eastwood as Shania's grandmother
 Joey Nijem as Garth - Shania's brother
 Nicola Correia-Damude as Ada Turing - a scientist who was Anne's friend, and main antagonist for seasons 3 and 4
 Devyn Nekoda as Charlie Cassini - one of Nick's science classmates
 Colin Mochrie as Mr. Cooper - Shania's grandmother's friend
 Naomi Snieckus as Ms. Cassini - Nick and Charlie's science teacher and Charlie's mom
 Dylan Everett as Dylan Turing - Ada's son
 Carson Reaume as Billy - Shania's brother
 Aaron Feigenbaum as Ray - Shania's brother

Episodes

Awards and nominations

References

External links 
 
 

2010s Canadian comic science fiction television series
2010s Canadian children's television series
2014 Canadian television series debuts
2017 Canadian television series endings
Canadian children's comedy television series
Canadian children's education television series
Canadian children's science fiction television series
TVO original programming
Amazon Prime Video original programming
English-language television shows
Middle school television series
Canadian television series with live action and animation
Amazon Prime Video children's programming
Canadian computer-animated television series
Television shows set in Ontario
Television series about children